Idan Malichi (born 11 June 1979) is an Israeli footballer who played for Bnei Yehuda Tel Aviv, F.C. Ashdod, Beitar Jerusalem and Maccabi Petah Tikva. At international level, Malichi was capped for the Israel national under-21 football team.

Sports career
Malichi began in the Maccabi Petah Tikva youth team, and in 1997/1998 season he went to the first team of the club.  In the first team Malichi won in the Toto Cup in 1999/2000 season and reached the Israel State Cup final in the next season.

In 2003/2004 season Malichi signed in Beitar Jerusalem.  Because of the arrival of many foreign players to Beitar such as Jérôme Leroy and Fabrice Fernandes and because of many injuries, Malichi barely played with the team.

References

1979 births
Israeli Jews
Living people
Israeli footballers
Beitar Jerusalem F.C. players
Maccabi Petah Tikva F.C. players
F.C. Ashdod players
Bnei Yehuda Tel Aviv F.C. players
Liga Leumit players
Israeli Premier League players
Footballers from Petah Tikva
Israel under-21 international footballers
Association football midfielders